London Power is an electricity and gas supply company in the United Kingdom, launched in 2019 by Sadiq Khan, Mayor of London, which only accepts customers at London addresses.

The company was established in July 2019 and began trading in January 2020. It is a wholly owned subsidiary of the Greater London Authority. Gas, 100% renewable electricity and customer service are supplied by Octopus Energy. The Authority states that any profits will be invested into delivering the Mayor's social and environmental goals.

References

Electric power companies of England
Companies based in London
Energy companies established in 2020
British companies established in 2020